{{DISPLAYTITLE:C12H19N3O}}
The molecular formula C12H19N3O (molar mass: 221.29 g/mol, exact mass: 221.1528 u) may refer to:

 Procarbazine, a drug against cancer
 Alchorneine, an alkaloid

Molecular formulas